Gustav of Sweden - English (actually Latin) also: Gustavus ; Swedish (legal spellings after 1900): Gustaf - may refer to:

Gustav I of Sweden, Gustav I Vasa, King of Sweden 1523-1560
Gustavus Adolphus of Sweden, Gustav II Adolph, King of Sweden 1611-1632
Gustav III of Sweden, King of Sweden 1771-1792
Gustav IV Adolf of Sweden, King of Sweden 1792-1809
Gustaf V of Sweden, King of Sweden 1907-1950
Gustaf VI Adolf of Sweden, King of Sweden 1950-1973
Prince Gustav of Sweden, Prince of Sweden 1568
Gustav, Prince of Sweden 1587, son of King Charles IX of Sweden (died in infancy)
Gustav Adolph, Prince of Sweden de facto 1652, son of Prince Adolph John I, Count Palatine of Kleeburg (died in infancy)
Gustav, Prince of Sweden 1683, son of King Charles XI of Sweden (died in infancy)
Gustav, Prince of Vasa, Crown Prince of Sweden 1799
Prince Gustaf, Duke of Uppland, Prince of Sweden 1827
Prince Gustaf Adolf, Duke of Västerbotten, Prince of Sweden 1906

See also
Gustaf of Sweden (disambiguation)
Carl Gustav of Sweden (disambiguation)